The Illumination of Alice J. Cunningham is a novel by Lyn Webster published in 1987.

Plot summary
The Illumination of Alice J. Cunningham is a novel in which Alice is trapped in a fantasy place created by an uncertain state of mind.

Reception
Dave Langford reviewed The Illumination of Alice J. Cunningham for White Dwarf #91, and stated that "A well-written and witty book which I enjoy without deciphering all the allegorical bits. Mea culpa."

Reviews
Review by Brian Stableford (1986) in Fantasy Review, October 1986
Review by David V. Barrett (1987) in Vector 140
Review by Lee Montgomerie (1987) in Interzone, #22 Winter 1987

References

1987 novels